RHEM 2 is an adventure game from Knut Müller and Got Game Entertainment and the sequel to RHEM. It is distributed as a Macromedia Director file. 

Like Myst and Riven, Rhem 2 is a node-based first-person adventure game. The player explores a series of caverns in search of a certain artifact. The puzzles involve spatial reasoning, operating machinery, and logic.

There is little plot or character interaction in Rhem 2; the emphasis lies solely on its puzzles. Many puzzles require the player to determine his location with respect to adjacent areas or objects in order to solve it. For instance, in order to solve a puzzle it may be necessary to trace a cable through a wall between two rooms, but the path from one room to the other is circuitous.

Plot
The game opens with the player's arrival in a series of caves underneath the city of Rhem. A video greeting from another explorer, Kales, explains that the player must find an artifact hidden somewhere within the caverns, take a photograph of it, and bring the photo to Kales's brother Zetais. The player must find the artifact in order to unlock the train and leave Rhem.

Reception

RHEM 2 received "generally favorable reviews" according to the review aggregation website Metacritic. Anise Hollingshead of GameZone praised the quantity and quality of the game's puzzles but criticized the graphics and voice acting.

References

External links 
 
 
 http://www.rhem-game.com/en/rhem2/index.htm
 Andrew Plotkin's review

2005 video games
Adventure games
First-person adventure games
Classic Mac OS games
MacOS games
Video games developed in Germany
Windows games
Got Game Entertainment games
Single-player video games